Gonodes trapezoides is a moth of the family Noctuidae first described by Gottlieb August Wilhelm Herrich-Schäffer in 1868. It is found on Cuba.

Taxonomy
The species was incorrectly synonymized with Elaphria subobliqua for some time.

References

Moths described in 1868
Hadeninae
Endemic fauna of Cuba